Samantha! is a Brazilian comedy streaming television series. It is the first Brazilian comedy produced by Netflix and the third Netflix series produced in Brazil, after 3% and O Mecanismo. The first season was released on July 6, 2018. It is directed by Luis Pinheiros and Julia Jordão, and scripted by Roberto Vitorino, Patricia Corso, Rafael Lessa and Filipe Valerim. The series follows Samantha, a former child star who had her own TV show and led the children's musical group Turminha Plimplom in the 1980s, and now schemes to launch herself back into the spotlight.

Netflix confirmed the production of the series in February 2017, during a press conference given by its founder. Its official teaser was released in June 2018, announcing its debut for the 6 of July of the same year. Months earlier, the service confirmed the production of season two which premiered on April 19, 2019.

On March 4, 2020, the series was canceled by Netflix.

Cast

Main
 Emanuelle Araújo as Samantha Alencar
 Douglas Silva as Douglas "Dodói" Alencar
 Sabrina Nonato as Cindy Alencar
 Cauã Gonçalves as Brandon Alencar
 Daniel Furlan as Marcinho

Recurring
 Duda Gonçalves as Samantha (young)
 Ary França as Zé Cigarrinho	
 Lorena Comparato as Laila
 Rodrigo Pandolfo as Tico
 Maurício Xavier as Bolota
 Zezeh Barbosa as Socorro Matias (season 2)		
 Alessandra Maestrini as Carmem Vecino (season 2)

Special guest
 Alice Braga as Symantha
 Alessandra Negrini as Liliane / Mushroom girl
 Maurício Xavier as Bolota (young)
 Enzo Oviedo as Tico (young)
 Jean Pierre Noher as Pablo Anton
 Rosaly Papadopol as Norminha
 Luciana Vendramini as Lenny K
 Giovanna Chaves as Valentina Vitória
 Paulo Tiefenthaler as Flávio Junior

Episodes

Season 1 (2018)

Season 2 (2019)

Reception

Critical response
Writing to the Cine Pop website, Rafaela Gomes praised Samantha!, giving the series a 4-star rating of 5: "Samantha! Brings with her a rich humor for her authentic contextualizations, playing with the mannerisms of both eras, placing us as spectators who observe these outside universes, and even be able to signal the ridiculous aspects with which we have become accustomed by virtue of familiarization." However, she adds that her first three episodes "stagger", with the series proving to be more interesting in the ensuing episodes, for its symbolic veracity created between the 80's and 2010.

Doktor Bruce of Freak Pop, said that the series "it's simply ingenious", and considers it one of the best Brazilian comedies, addressing the absurdities that occurred on Brazilian TV in the 80's, and that it seeks current elements about those people who try to remain in the media at all costs.

References

External links
 Samantha! on Netflix
 

2010s Brazilian television series
2018 Brazilian television series debuts
Brazilian comedy television series
Portuguese-language Netflix original programming
Television shows filmed in São Paulo (state)
Television shows set in São Paulo